Grand Pacific Pass, is a significant mountain pass in the Fairweather Range of the Alsek Ranges of the Saint Elias Mountains, standing northeast of the massif containing Mount Fairweather.  A glacial pass, it is impassable for ordinary purposes.  The pass forms the divide between Grand Pacific Glacier and Melbern Glacier, which flow south and north to Tarr Inlet and the Alsek River, respectively.

References 

Mountain passes of British Columbia